The men's sprint cross-country skiing competition at the FIS Nordic World Ski Championships 2005 was held on 22 February 2005 in Oberstdorf, Germany.

Results

Qualification
89 competitors started the qualification race.

Quarterfinals
Q - Qualified for next round
PF - Photo Finish

Quarterfinal 1

Quarterfinal 2

Quarterfinal 3

Quarterfinal 4

Semifinals

Semifinal 1

Semifinal 2

Finals

Final A

Final B

References

External links
Qualification results
Final results

FIS Nordic World Ski Championships 2005